Milota is a village in Szabolcs-Szatmár-Bereg county, in the Northern Great Plain region of eastern Hungary.

Geography
Milota has a population of 909 people (2015).

References

Milota